Njabuliso Simelane (born 22 November 1979) is a Swaziland international footballer who plays as a goalkeeper. As of February 2010, he plays for Green Mamba in the Swazi Premier League and has won 16 caps for his country. He was part of the 2010 qualifier team that beat Togo 2-1, but conceded six, four of them to Emmanuel Adebayor, as Swaziland lost 6-0.

He was released by Green Mamba in 2012. While playing with Malanti Chiefs the following season, he was involved in an incident at Somhlolo National Stadium where two fans rushed the field and wrestled him for his drink.

References

External links

1979 births
Living people
Association football goalkeepers
Swazi footballers
Eswatini international footballers
Green Mamba F.C. players
Malanti Chiefs F.C. players